The 2005 McDonald's All-American Boys Game was an All-star basketball game played on Wednesday, March 30, 2005 at the Joyce Center in South Bend, Indiana, home of the Fighting Irish of Notre Dame. The game's rosters featured the best and most highly recruited high school boys graduating in 2005.  The game was the 28th annual version of the McDonald's All-American Game first played in 1978.

The 48 players were selected from 2,500 nominees by a committee of basketball experts. They were chosen not only for their on-court skills, but for their performances off the court as well. Coach Morgan Wootten, who had more than 1,200 wins as head basketball coach at DeMatha High School, was chairman of the selection committee. Legendary UCLA coach John Wooden, who has been involved in the McDonald's All American Games since its inception, served as chairman of the Games and as an advisor to the selection committee.

Proceeds from the 2005 McDonald's All American High School Basketball Games went to Ronald McDonald House Charities (RMHC) of South Bend and Fort Wayne, Indiana and their Ronald McDonald House programs.

2005 Game
The game was telecast live by ESPN.  At first glance, the 2005 edition of the McDonald’s All American boys team seemed to lack the “star power” of the 2003 and 2004 squads as they invaded  Notre Dame’s Joyce Center in March 2005. That perception was soon put to rest as seven players were taken in the 2005 NBA Draft.

Unlike most all-star events, the 2005 McDonald’s Game was a close contest that brought much excitement to the  Joyce Center. The East held a hefty lead most of the game and ended the first half with a 22-point lead thanks to high flying Gerald Green (former Dallas Maverick), who led all scorers with 24 points on 8-of-12 shooting. Greg Paulus had nine assists and 13 points, making 7-of-8 free throws in the final 2 minutes to help the East hang onto the
115-110 victory.

Other key contributors for the East included, shooting guards Louis Williams and Eric Devendorf (Syracuse), who recorded 14 and 13 points respectively.

The West team had several players who helped lead the charge from their 22-point deficit. Mario Chalmers (Miami Heat) led the West with a team high 20 points, five steals and five assists. Martell Webster (Portland Trail Blazers) started the game with two consecutive three-point baskets on his way to 16 points for the contest. Small forward Julian Wright (New Orleans Hornets) had a solid performance with 14 points, four assists and three rebounds.

West Roster

East Roster

Coaches
The West team was coached by:
 Head Coach Al Rhodes of Logansport North High School (Logansport, Indiana)
 Asst Coach Pete Smith of Guerin Catholic High School (Noblesville, Indiana)

The East team was coached by:
 Head Coach Jack Keefer of Lawrence North High School (Indianapolis, Indiana)
 Asst Coach Ralph Scott of Lawrence North High School (Indianapolis, Indiana)

Boxscore

Visitors: West

Home: East 

(* = Starting Line-up)

All-American Week

Schedule 

 Tuesday, March 29: Powerade Jamfest
 Slam Dunk Contest
 Three-Point Shoot-out
 Timed Basketball Skills Competition
 Wednesday, March 30: 28th Annual Boys All-American Game

The Powerade JamFest is a skills-competition evening featuring basketball players who demonstrate their skills in three crowd-entertaining ways.  The slam dunk contest was first held in 1987, and a 3-point shooting challenge was added in 1989.  This year, for the first time, a timed basketball skills competition was added to the schedule of events.

Contest Winners 
 The 2005 Powerade Slam Dunk contest was won by Gerald Green.
 Mario Chalmers was winner of the 2005 3-point shoot-out.
 The skills competition was won by Richard Hendrix

See also
 2005 McDonald's All-American Girls Game

References

External links

2004–05 in American basketball
2005
2005 in sports in Indiana
Basketball in Indiana